Ben Crameri (born 6 June 1936) is a former Australian rules footballer who played for the Melbourne Football Club in the Victorian Football League (VFL).

He coached Northcote from 1964 to 1967.

Notes

External links 

1936 births
Australian rules footballers from Victoria (Australia)
Melbourne Football Club players
Northcote Football Club players
Northcote Football Club coaches
Living people